Yateley School is the largest secondary school in North East Hampshire. The school teaches over 1500 students aged 11 – 16, and the attached sixth form college caters for ages 16–18. The school had its latest Ofsted Report in 2018, where the school achieved a good rating, and the Sixth Form College achieved an outstanding rating.

Yateley School consists of four houses named after significant British people: (Charles) Darwin, (Emmeline) Pankhurst, (Florence) Nightingale and (William) Wilberforce.

In the 2008 Ofsted report, it is noted that the Sixth Form made significant improvements after a new Director of Sixth Form was appointed (shortly before the 2008 Ofsted inspection).

In 2016, Year 11 had achieved the school's highest GCSE results in the past four years.

External Achievements 
Yateley School's Dance Team won the UK Global Rock Challenge in 2015 after winning the national finals in Milton Keynes.

School Campus 
Yateley School has a range of facilities including a swimming pool, drama studios, a library, a sports hall, a gymnastics hall, dance and music studios, tennis courts and three large playing fields. In April 2015 a new £1 million project was launched to improve the school's 'A Block' which consists of Science facilities and Humanities. The students were moved into temporary buildings placed along the A Block Playground until the refurbishment was complete. It was completed in April 2016. The school's main hall has also been renovated recently.

Notable former pupils
Chris Benham, former Hampshire cricketer
Nick Benham, ESAA Champion at 1500m
Christina Cahill (nee Boxer), Olympic runner, fourth in 800m at Seoul Olympics 1988
David Copeland, the "London Nail Bomber"
Alexa Goddard, pop singer and YouTube personality
Aaron Kuhl, semi-professional footballer
Emma Stenning - internationally acclaimed Theatre Producer
Peter Morey - top Canadian DJ
Robin King - Film maker
David Crow - actor and writer of TV comedy
Victoria Lucass, Olympic synchronised swimmer
Max and Harvey Mills, pop singer duo
Kerry Shacklock International synchronised swimmer
Andrew Willis, Olympic swimmer
Lloyd Macklin, Ex-semi-professional footballer
Breathe (British band) 80's band

References

External links
School website
Yateleys
BBC Profile

Secondary schools in Hampshire
Community schools in Hampshire